Sergey Tsoy (born January 7, 1986) is an Uzbek former swimmer, who specialized in butterfly events. Tsoy competed for Uzbekistan in the  men's 400 m freestyle at the 2004 Summer Olympics in Athens. He achieved a FINA B-cut of 4:02.11 from the Kazakhstan Open Championships in Almaty. He challenged six other swimmers in heat one, including Qatar's 14-year-old Anas Abu-Yousuf and Philippines' two-time Olympian Miguel Mendoza. Entering the race with the fastest-seeded time, Tsoy faded down the final stretch to pick up a sixth seed in 4:16.91, more than fifteen seconds off the leading time set by Mendoza (4:01.99). Tsoy failed to reach the top 8 final, as he placed forty-fifth overall on the first day of prelims.

References

1986 births
Living people
Uzbekistani male freestyle swimmers
Uzbekistani people of Korean descent
Olympic swimmers of Uzbekistan
Swimmers at the 2004 Summer Olympics
Sportspeople from Tashkent
21st-century Uzbekistani people